A Compilation of Scott Weiland Cover Songs is a compilation album by Stone Temple Pilots frontman Scott Weiland, released on August 30, 2011 by Softdrive Records. The album consists entirely of cover songs, featuring an array of covers of artists that inspired Weiland, such as David Bowie, The Beatles, The Rolling Stones, and The Smiths. The album was originally set to be released together with Weiland's memoir Not Dead & Not for Sale but Weiland decided later to release the album by itself exclusively in digital format.

The cover of the Beatles' "Revolution" is actually a Stone Temple Pilots recording that was originally released as a single in 2001, in honor of 9/11, with proceeds going to the Twin Towers Fund.

"Reel Around the Fountain" and "Fame" previously appeared on Weiland's 2008 album "Happy" in Galoshes (the former only available on the "Deluxe" edition).

Track listing

Personnel
 Scott Weiland – lead vocals, keyboards, piano
 Doug Grean – guitar, bass
 Adrian Young – drums, percussion
 Michael Weiland – drums
 Matt O'Connor – drums, percussion
 Dean DeLeo – guitar on track 8
 Robert DeLeo – bass on track 8
 Eric Kretz – drums on track 8

References

External links
 

2011 albums
Scott Weiland albums
Softdrive Records albums
Covers albums